Sambandham was an informal mode of marriage followed by Nambudiris, Nairs, Samantha Kshatriyas, Kshatriyas and Ambalavasis among their own communities as well as with each other, in colonial Kerala, India. This practice was stopped during the late 1920s, and is no longer observed. The Malabar Marriage Act, 1896 defined Sambandham as, "An alliance between a man and a woman, by reason of which they, in accordance with the custom of the community to which they belong, or to which either of them belongs, cohabit or intend to cohabit as husband and wife."

Sambandham also denoted reciprocal marriage among Nairs and this term was not used just to denote hypergamous marriages between the Nambudiris and the Nairs. Alternate names for the system were used by different social groups and in different regions; they included Pudavamuri, Pudavakoda, Vastradanam, Vitaram Kayaruka, Mangalam and Uzhamporukkuka.

Practice

Among Nairs 
The Nair women were allowed to take a number of husbands, the number could be of dozens but usually there were three or four regular sambandam husbands. The Nair women also had temporary relationships with the Nair soldiers passing through the area. There were no resentment among the Sambandam husbands who also had numerous sambandam wives and they would also arrange schedules to avoid overlaps when they visited their wives at night. The visiting husband placed his weapons outside the bedroom door and if another husband arrived, he might sleep in the veranda after seeing his weapons. If the women became pregnant, one of the husbands usually accepted the child. If no appropriate man accepted the child, then she is deemed to have had sexual intercourse with a man from a lower caste or even from a man belonging to one of the lower Nair sub-castes. The women was punished in front of the entire enangar, disowned her caste and could be sold as a slave.

Among Nambudhiri Brahmins 
Among the Nambudhiri's, the eldest son was only allowed to marry a brahmin woman and make an inheritor to the family's property. The remaining younger sons had sambandam relationships with the Nair women, the elder sons also had sambandham relationships with Nair women along with their Brahmin wives. The Brahmins considered this as concubinage because of their paternal lineage and the Nairs however considered this as legitimate marriages because their lineage passed in a maternal line. Since, the brahmin man was considered more ritually pure than his sambandam Nair wife, he could not touch her or her children or eat in her house during the day-time while he was in a state of ritual purity.

See also
 Kettu Kalyanam
 Malayali Brahmins

References

Sources
 Moore, Melinda. "Symbol and Meaning in Nayar Marriage Ritual." American Ethnologist. 15 (1998) 254–273
 Gough, K. (1961) Nayar: Central Kearla, in Schneider, D. M. & Gough, K. (Eds.) Matrilineal Kinship. Berkeley & Los Angeles, p298-404
 Karl, R. (2003) Women in Practice: A Comparative Analysis of Gender and Sexuality in India. 2003 Marleigh Grayer Ryan Student Prize ; Moore, M. (1998) Symbol and Meaning in Nayar Marriage Ritual, American Ethnologist 15:254-73
 Damodar Dharmanand Kosambi (1975) An Introduction to the Study of Indian History.
 Dirks, Nicholas. "Homo Hierarchies: Origins of an Idea." Castes of Mind. Princeton: Princeton University Press 2001.

Indian castes
Indian surnames
Kerala society
Telugu society